The 1968 United States elections were held on November 5, and elected members of the 91st United States Congress. The election took place during the Vietnam War, in the same year as the Tet Offensive, the assassination of Martin Luther King, Jr., the assassination of Robert F. Kennedy, and the protests of 1968. The Republican Party won control of the presidency, and picked up seats in the House and Senate, although the Democratic Party retained control of Congress.

In the presidential election, Republican former Vice President Richard Nixon defeated Democratic incumbent Vice President Hubert Humphrey. Nixon won the popular vote by less than one point, but took most states outside the Northeast, and comfortably won the electoral vote. Former Alabama Governor George Wallace, of the American Independent Party, took 13.5% of the popular vote, and won the electoral votes of the Deep South. After incumbent Democratic President Lyndon B. Johnson declined to seek re-election, Humphrey won the Democratic nomination over Minnesota Senator Eugene McCarthy and South Dakota Senator George McGovern at the tumultuous 1968 Democratic National Convention. Nixon won the Republican nomination over New York Governor Nelson Rockefeller and California Governor Ronald Reagan. As of 2022, Wallace is the most recent third-party candidate to win a state's entire share of electoral votes. Nixon became the first former (non-sitting) vice president to win a presidential election; he was the only person to achieve that until former Vice President Joe Biden won the 2020 Presidential election.

The Republican Party won a net gain of five seats in both the House and the Senate. However, the Democratic Party retained strong majorities in both houses of Congress. In the gubernatorial elections, the Republican Party picked up a net gain of five governorships. This was the second consecutive election where the winning presidential party had coattails in both houses of Congress and the first for Republicans since 1952.

This was the first of two times since 1889 that a newly elected President's party failed to control either house of Congress.

See also

1968 United States presidential election
1968 United States House of Representatives elections
1968 United States Senate elections
1968 United States gubernatorial elections

References

 
1968